Beginning in the 2021–22 academic year, extensive changes occurred in NCAA conference membership, primarily at the Division I level.

Most of these changes have involved conferences in the Football Bowl Subdivision (FBS) of Division I. Of the 10 FBS conferences, seven will undergo changes in membership. Three conferences (Atlantic Coast Conference, Big Ten Conference, and Pac-12 Conference) formed an alliance of their own, but it did not prevent two Pac-12 members from announcing their move to the Big Ten.

The Division I Football Championship Subdivision (FCS) also saw significant changes, most notably the beginning of football sponsorship by the ASUN Conference; the return of football by the Western Athletic Conference, which previously sponsored football at the FBS level until the end of the 2012 season; and two impending football-only conference mergers, one involving the ASUN and WAC and the other involving the Big South Conference and Ohio Valley Conference (OVC).

Other sports saw significant change. The most notable changes have been the reinstatement of men's soccer by the Sun Belt Conference, which ultimately led to both Conference USA and the Mid-American Conference dropping the sport; the addition of men's volleyball by the Northeast Conference (NEC), making it the second D-I all-sports conference to sponsor the sport; the addition of men's lacrosse by the Atlantic 10 Conference, leading to the NEC and the Southern Conference dropping the sport; the merger of the men's tennis leagues of the OVC and the Horizon League; the merger of the baseball leagues of the Mid-Eastern Athletic Conference and NEC; and the reestablishment of the Central Collegiate Hockey Association (CCHA) in men's ice hockey, which led to the Western Collegiate Hockey Association (WCHA) disbanding its men's league and becoming a women's-only conference.

FBS conferences affected

Southeastern Conference

On July 21, 2021, the Houston Chronicle reported that Oklahoma and Texas had approached the Southeastern Conference (SEC) about the possibility of joining that league. On July 26, Oklahoma and Texas notified the Big 12 Conference that the two schools did not wish to extend their grant of television rights beyond the 2024–25 athletic year and intended to leave the conference. On July 29, the presidents and chancellors of the 14 current SEC members voted unanimously to extend invitations to Oklahoma and Texas, effective in 2025. The two schools eventually reached a buyout agreement with the Big 12 that will allow them to join the SEC in 2024.

Big 12 Conference

With the losses of Texas and Oklahoma, the Big 12 Conference was reduced from 10 to 8 teams. On September 10, the Big 12 announced that  BYU, an FBS independent and full member of the non-football West Coast Conference (WCC), along with American Athletic Conference (The American) members Cincinnati, Houston, and UCF would join the conference no later than 2024–25. At the time of announcement, BYU stated that it would join the Big 12 in 2023. The other three schools entered into negotiations with The American regarding their departure date, and on June 10, 2022, an agreement on a 2023 departure date was announced.

On November 2, 2022, ESPN reported that Gonzaga University athletic director Chris Standiford had met with Big 12 commissioner Brett Yormark while the Gonzaga men's basketball team was in the Dallas area, home to the Big 12 offices, for a scrimmage with Tennessee. This meeting was reportedly part of discussions regarding a possible Gonzaga move to the Big 12 as a full member without football (Gonzaga has not had a football program since 1941). Gonzaga men's basketball has become by far the dominant program in the otherwise mid-major WCC. Going into the 2022–23 season, the Bulldogs had played in every NCAA men's tournament in the 21st century, made national championship games in 2017 and 2021, and had been a top regional seed in four of the previous five NCAA tournaments. Gonzaga, which has been transparent with the WCC about its talks with other conferences, has reportedly also been in membership discussions with the Pac-12 Conference and the Big East Conference (the latter a non-football league).

Pac-12 and Big Ten Conferences
On August 24, 2021, the Pac-12 and the Big Ten, along with the Atlantic Coast Conference, announced that the three leagues would be forming a scheduling alliance, likely in response to the SEC's recent expansion. It consisted of adding games between teams in these three conferences in football, as well as men's and women's college basketball.

On June 30, 2022, media reports indicated that UCLA and USC had started the process of leaving the Pac-12 Conference for the Big Ten Conference, with the latter conference's presidents and chancellors having scheduled a meeting that evening to vote on the addition of the two Los Angeles schools. Shortly after this meeting, the Big Ten and both schools issued statements confirming this move, setting a 2024 entry date, which is immediately after the current Pac-12 media rights contracts expire.

American Athletic Conference

The losses of Cincinnati, Houston, and UCF left the AAC with 8 remaining schools. After invitations to Mountain West Conference members Boise State, Air Force, Colorado State, and San Diego State to join the AAC were all declined, the AAC then pivoted to Conference USA (C-USA) to add 6 of its members on October 21, 2021: Charlotte, Florida Atlantic, UAB, North Texas, Rice, and UTSA. In June 2022, the six schools' entry date of July 2023 was officially confirmed. The additions will put the AAC at 14 members for both football and basketball, with Navy being a football-only member and Wichita State being a non-football full member.

In May 2022, The American announced that the four schools that had remained in C-USA men's soccer after the Sun Belt Conference took five schools from the C-USA men's soccer league to reinstate the sport effective with the upcoming 2022 season—Charlotte, FIU, Florida Atlantic, and UAB—would become men's soccer members in the 2022 season, thus spelling the end of C-USA men's soccer. Of these schools, all but FIU will become full members of The American in 2023. FIU and Florida Atlantic would also join in women's swimming & diving in July 2022, as did future American Conference members North Texas and Rice.

Sun Belt Conference

The departures of the aforementioned 6 schools reduced Conference USA's membership from 14 to 8, and sensing the instability of the conference, the remaining members looked to join other conferences. In late October 2021, C-USA members Southern Miss, Old Dominion and Marshall applied and were accepted to the Sun Belt Conference (SBC) to begin play in the 2022–23 season. On November 6, the Sun Belt added James Madison, a Colonial Athletic Association member playing FCS football. Due to the Colonial's policy of prohibiting departing members from participating in conference tournaments, JMU was initially slated to play the 2022–23 football season as an FBS independent with other sports playing as de facto Sun Belt affiliates; full membership would have begun with the 2023–24 season. However, on February 2, 2022, JMU and the Sun Belt announced that JMU would join for all sports sponsored by the conference, including football, on July 1. On February 11, Southern Miss, Old Dominion, and Marshall announced that they too would join the Sun Belt Conference in 2022. However, C-USA had previously indicated on January 20 that it expected all three schools to remain in the league through 2022–23. ESPN journalist Adam Rittenberg cited an unnamed source regarding this development, "It's not going to be an amicable split. It's gotten ugly, and I assume it's going to get uglier." The source's prediction was apparently proven true when Marshall filed suit against C-USA in its local court in an attempt to force a 2022 move. On March 1, the Sun Belt released its 2022 football schedule with Marshall, Old Dominion, and Southern Miss included, making no mention of the ongoing legal dispute or the possibility that the three schools would not become members for the 2022–23 school year. By the end of that month, the three schools and C-USA reached a settlement that allowed the schools to join the Sun Belt in July 2022.

The increase in the SBC football membership led to reports that the conference's two non-football members, Little Rock and UT Arlington, would leave the conference; this eventually did happen, with Little Rock joining the Ohio Valley Conference and UT Arlington rejoining the Western Athletic Conference (WAC), a league in which it had been a member in the 2012–13 school year.

SEC-Big 12 Alliance in Men's Soccer moves to Sun Belt 

These various moves also led the SBC to reinstate men's soccer, a sport that it had dropped after the 2020–21 school year when a combination of COVID-19 impact and earlier realignment had left the conference with only three men's soccer programs, half of the number required for a D-I conference to maintain its automatic NCAA tournament bid. With three of the four incoming members (Marshall, Old Dominion, and James Madison) sponsoring men's soccer, SBC commissioner Keith Gill had announced in November 2021 that the sport would be reinstated in 2023–24. After the entry of the aforementioned schools was pushed forward to July 2022, the SBC announced on April 6, 2022 that men's soccer would be reinstated for 2022–23. The three incoming members, plus existing full members Coastal Carolina, Georgia Southern, and Georgia State, were joined by the Southeastern Conference  and Big 12 Conference members that sponsor the sport -- Kentucky, South Carolina, and West Virginia. Later on, the Sun Belt also announced that future Big 12 member UCF would join as a men's soccer affiliate when it joins the Big 12 in 2023, effectively creating a "6-4" format of six Sun Belt schools and four schools from the non-sponsoring SEC or Big 12 conferences.

The reinstatement of SBC men's soccer left the future of men's soccer in C-USA and the Mid-American Conference in serious doubt, as the two Georgia schools and West Virginia had been MAC men's soccer members (West Virginia had, however, planned to move that sport to C-USA before the Sun Belt reinstated men's soccer), while Coastal Carolina, South Carolina, and Kentucky had been C-USA men's soccer members. This then left both leagues with only four members in the 2022 season. Additionally, C-USA was set to lose three of its four remaining programs for the following season, with Charlotte, Florida Atlantic, and UAB making their move to The American in 2023. This would leave C-USA with only two institutions that sponsor the sport in 2023: FIU and Liberty, the latter of whom would be joining C-USA that season. Due to this, The American decided to admit the existing four C-USA soccer programs to their own league, with all four competing as affiliates in 2022 and FIU continuing as an affiliate after the other schools become full members. With C-USA no longer sponsoring soccer, though, Liberty has yet to announce a new conference for its own program. Meanwhile, the MAC was able to add Chicago State, who was departing from the Western Athletic Conference in all sports, as a men's soccer associate, bringing their own membership to 5. Chicago State ended up becoming an all-sports independent.

At the end of the 2022 season, the MAC discontinued men's soccer as a sponsored sport, having failed to find the sixth member needed to maintain its automatic bid to the NCAA tournament. Of the four full MAC members that sponsored men's soccer in the 2022 season, Bowling Green, Northern Illinois, and Western Michigan moved the sport to the Missouri Valley Conference, and Akron moved it to the Big East Conference. Chicago State has yet to announce a future men's soccer affiliation.

Conference USA

Having lost 6 of its 14 members to The American and 3 to the SBC, Conference USA was left with 5 remaining members, short of the NCAA minimum of 6 and the FBS minimum of 8. On November 5, 2021, C-USA invited four schools: FBS independents Liberty and New Mexico State, who respectively play non-football sports in the ASUN Conference and Western Athletic Conference; full ASUN member Jacksonville State; and full WAC member Sam Houston. All four schools will begin C-USA play with the 2023–24 season. Per NCAA rules Jacksonville State and Sam Houston serve a two-year probationary period. Liberty and New Mexico State are established FBS members and do not have to serve probationary periods.

Around the same time, reports surfaced that C-USA members Western Kentucky and Middle Tennessee were poised to join the Mid-American Conference (MAC). However, Middle Tennessee elected to remain in C-USA, and the MAC did not invite Western Kentucky after Middle Tennessee did not join.

In April 2022, it was announced that Dallas Baptist would be moving its baseball program from the Missouri Valley Conference to C-USA effective that July (with play starting in the 2023 season). While all other Dallas Baptist University teams compete in Division II, primarily in the Lone Star Conference, the baseball team competes in Division I. DBU is also the last D-II member playing D-I baseball.

On October 14, 2022, C-USA announced that another ASUN member, Kennesaw State, would start a transition to FBS after the 2022 football season and join C-USA in 2024.

FCS conferences affected

Western Athletic Conference

On January 14, 2021, the Western Athletic Conference, which last sponsored football at the FBS level during the 2012 season, announced its intention to reinstate football as a conference-sponsored sport at the FCS level, as well as the addition of five new members to the conference in all sports. The new members announced included four Southland Conference members from Texas in Abilene Christian, Lamar, Sam Houston, and Stephen F. Austin, plus Southern Utah from the Big Sky Conference. Those five schools joined existing WAC members Tarleton and Utah Tech (known as Dixie State before May 2022) to make up the WAC's initial football membership. The four Southland schools were initially planned to join the WAC for the 2022–23 school year, but the WAC pushed their entry forward to 2021–22 after the Southland expelled all four schools. Southern Utah joined on its originally planned schedule of 2022–23, with SUU and the Big Sky agreeing to honor their scheduling commitments for 2021–22.

That same day, WAC non-football member UTRGV announced that it would begin sponsoring football no later than the 2024 season, while the WAC announced that Chicago State, a geographical outlier for much of its time in the WAC, would depart the conference on July 1, 2022. UTRGV would later delay the addition of football to 2025.

On November 12, the WAC added Southland member Incarnate Word for the 2022–23 season. Though fellow Southland member McNeese was rumored to be joining the WAC along with Incarnate Word, it instead chose to remain in the Southland. On January 21, 2022, the WAC added Sun Belt Conference member UT Arlington, which had joined and left the WAC in the early-2010s realignment cycle, for the 2022–23 season.

On April 8, Lamar University announced that it would rejoin the Southland Conference for 2023-24, spending only two years in the WAC. On July 11, Lamar's transition was moved up to the 2022-23 season.

The WAC and ASUN Conference jointly announced on May 18 that they would renew their football partnership, which was originally intended to operate only in the 2021 season. Each conference had planned to have 6 members that were eligible for the FCS playoffs in the 2022 season, but the start of FBS transitions by outgoing ASUN member Jacksonville State and outgoing WAC member Sam Houston rendered both ineligible for the 2022 playoffs.

On June 24, 2022, one week before it was scheduled to join the WAC, Incarnate Word announced that it would instead remain in the Southland Conference. Along with the departures of New Mexico State and Sam Houston to Conference USA and Lamar back to the Southland, the WAC will have 11 members going forward, 6 of which will play football in the conference.

ESPN reported on December 9, 2022 that the WAC and ASUN had agreed to form a new football-only conference that plans to start play in 2024. The initial football membership would consist of Austin Peay, Central Arkansas, Eastern Kentucky, and North Alabama from the ASUN, and Abilene Christian, Southern Utah, Stephen F. Austin, Tarleton, and Utah Tech from the WAC. UTRGV would become the 10th member upon its planned addition of football in 2025. The new football conference also reportedly plans to move "from what is currently known as FCS football to what is currently known as FBS football at the earliest practicable date." The two conferences made this official on December 20, announcing that they would operate a single football league, tentatively known as the ASUN–WAC Football Conference, starting in 2023. Because of prior scheduling commitments, the football league will play a six-game schedule in the 2023 season and play a full round-robin in 2024. This announcement did not mention a potential move to FBS.

ASUN Conference

On January 29, 2021, the ASUN Conference (formerly the Atlantic Sun Conference) announced that it too would begin sponsoring football at the FCS level beginning in 2022–23, as well as announcing three new members for the 2021–22 season: Jacksonville State and Eastern Kentucky from the Ohio Valley Conference, and Central Arkansas from the Southland Conference. Those three schools plus existing ASUN members Kennesaw State and North Alabama, which had been playing football in the Big South Conference, would make up the first five ASUN football members, with a requisite sixth member to be announced at a later date. For the 2021 football season, the ASUN and WAC formed a football-only partnership, with the three new ASUN members competing alongside WAC members for an automatic bid to the FCS playoffs.

On September 17, that sixth football member was revealed to be Austin Peay, which would join the conference for 2022–23. Though the ASUN has the requisite 6 football members for the 2022 season, the impending departures of Jacksonville State in 2023 and Kennesaw State in 2024 will necessitate replacement football members to meet the conference minimum. No such member has been announced. ASUN full member Stetson plays football in the Pioneer Football League, a conference for Division I FCS schools that do not offer football scholarships.

Shortly before Peay was announced as an incoming member, media reports indicated that the ASUN had approached at least five Division II members regarding possible membership—football-sponsoring Valdosta State, West Florida, and West Georgia and non-football Lincoln Memorial and Queens (NC). On May 7, 2022, Queens, from the D-II South Atlantic Conference, announced that it would move up to Division I and join the ASUN Conference beginning with the 2022–23 season. The ASUN made this move official three days later.

On May 18, the ASUN and WAC announced that they had renewed their 2021 football partnership for the 2022 season. That October, Kennesaw State announced its 2024 departure for Conference USA. This was followed in December 2022 by the two conferences announcing their football-only merger.

Southland Conference

With much of the Southland Conference's (SLC) football membership leaving for the WAC and ASUN, on September 28, 2021, the Southland announced that Division II school Texas A&M–Commerce would move up from the D-II Lone Star Conference to Division I and join the conference beginning with the 2022–23 season. At the time, this left the Southland with 8 full members, 6 of which play football.

Shortly after A&M–Commerce was announced as an incoming member, the Southland and Ohio Valley Conference, which had lost three football-sponsoring schools in this realignment cycle (and would later lose a fourth), announced a football scheduling alliance for the 2022 and 2023 seasons.

On April 8, 2022, Lamar University announced that it would rejoin the Southland Conference for 2023-24, spending only two years in the WAC before rejoining a conference where it had been a member from 1963–87 and again from 1999-2021. On July 11, Lamar announced that it would instead move to the Southland in time for the 2022-23 season.

On June 24, 2022 Incarnate Word announced that instead of joining the WAC on July 1 as previously planned, it would remain in the Southland Conference.

During this cycle, the SLC expanded its affiliate membership far beyond its primary post-2021 footprint of Louisiana and Texas. Nine schools in all joined, with six from East Coast states and single schools from California, Idaho, and Illinois. First, on June 22, 2021, the SLC announced that NJIT would join in men's and women's tennis effective that July. Two days later, the SLC added four schools for golf, also for 2021–22—Francis Marion, a Division II member that plays D-I men's golf, in that sport; Delaware State and Maryland Eastern Shore in women's golf; and Augusta, a D-II member that fields D-I teams in men's and women's golf, in both. In June 2022, the SLC added two more schools as affiliates effective the next month, with Boise State joining in beach volleyball and Bryant joining for men's & women's golf and tennis. However, it would lose two of those new affiliates in 2022–23 when Delaware State and Maryland Eastern Shore moved women's golf to the more geographically appropriate Northeast Conference (NEC) after that conference entered into a partnership with those schools' full-time home of the Mid-Eastern Athletic Conference in baseball and men's and women's golf. Shortly after the MEAC–NEC announcement, the SLC gained a men's tennis affiliate in UIC, whose new home of the Missouri Valley Conference sponsors tennis only for women. Also, San Jose State joined for beach volleyball, uniting it with Boise State, the only other Mountain West Conference member sponsoring that sport.

Ohio Valley Conference

In addition to three Ohio Valley Conference (OVC) football members joining the ASUN, two additional OVC members have announced their intent to leave the conference. On September 28, 2021, non-football member Belmont announced it would join the Missouri Valley Conference (MVC) for the 2022–23 season. On January 7, 2022, Murray State announced that it too would join the MVC for 2022–23. Though the MVC does not sponsor football, Murray State applied to (and eventually joined) the Missouri Valley Football Conference (a separate entity from the Missouri Valley Conference) starting with the 2023 season. At the time of this announcement, the expected 2023 departure of Murray State football would have left the Ohio Valley Conference with 5 football members. (Full OVC member Morehead State plays non-scholarship football in the Pioneer Football League.)

On December 9, 2021, Sun Belt Conference non-football member Little Rock was announced as the newest OVC member starting with the 2022–23 season. Following this, reports began to surface that the OVC had anticipated Murray State leaving, and had actively been exploring other options for expansion, with current D-I FCS schools Arkansas-Pine Bluff of the Southwestern Athletic Conference and Western Illinois of the Summit League, as well as D-II schools Southern Indiana, Hillsdale, Grand Valley State, and Lincoln Memorial, all being named as potential candidates. Exactly two months after Little Rock joined, on February 9, 2022, it was confirmed that Southern Indiana, a non-football sponsoring member from the D-II Great Lakes Valley Conference (GLVC), would begin the process of reclassifying to D-I and would join the OVC in July 2022. Later that same month, on February 23, another GLVC member, the football-sponsoring Lindenwood, was announced as a July 2022 entry.

The day before the Lindenwood announcement saw a major change to the FCS landscape when the OVC and Big South Conference announced their plans to merge their respective football leagues effective in 2023. Certain major details of the alliance—specifically, whether it would be operated by the Big South or OVC, or become a completely separate entity—were not revealed at the time.

On July 6, 2022, the Ohio Valley Conference (OVC) and Horizon League announced their plans to merge their respective men's tennis leagues effective immediately. Ohio Valley members that sponsor the sport will compete as affiliate members under the banner of the  Horizon League men's tennis championship. The expanded Horizon men's tennis league also includes Belmont, which had officially left the OVC for the MVC days earlier.

Colonial Athletic Association

The departure of James Madison left the Colonial Athletic Association (CAA) with 9 all-sports members, with 11 schools participating in the technically separate entity of CAA Football. On January 18, 2022, NJ.com reported that Monmouth, a full member of the Metro Atlantic Athletic Conference and football-only member of the Big South Conference, would join both sides of the CAA starting in 2022–23. They also reported Big South full member Hampton and America East Conference member Stony Brook would probably join the CAA. Hampton had been working toward an eventual CAA invitation since at least 1995, and Stony Brook had been a member of CAA Football since 2013. On January 25, all three schools were officially announced as new members of the all-sports CAA for 2022–23, with Hampton and Monmouth also joining CAA Football.

On February 18, 2022, North Carolina A&T received approval from its board of trustees to move from the Big South to the CAA, and the CAA officially announced A&T's move on February 22. While A&T joined the all-sports CAA for the 2022–23 season, the football team will wait until the 2023 season to move to CAA Football.

On August 3, 2022, Campbell announced that it too would leave the Big South for both sides of the CAA beginning with the 2023–24 academic year.

Big South Conference

On January 25, 2022, the Colonial Athletic Association announced that Big South Conference full member Hampton and football-only member Monmouth would join both sides of the CAA for the 2022–23 season. On February 22, the CAA announced that North Carolina A&T would join the all-sports CAA in 2022–23 and CAA Football a year later. These departures, along with football-only members Kennesaw State and North Alabama leaving to play in the ASUN Conference, at the time brought the Big South membership down to 10 full members and 5 football members, the latter being one short of the conference minimum. (Big South full member Presbyterian plays non-scholarship football in the Pioneer Football League.) On March 29, 2022, the football membership was restored to 6 with the announcement that Bryant would join as a football-only member effective with the 2022 season, but A&T's 2023 departure for CAA Football would again reduce the football membership to 5. On August 3, 2022, the Big South lost another football member as Campbell announced that it would join the CAA for the 2023–24 academic year.

As noted previously, the Big South and OVC will merge their football leagues effective in 2023.

Big Sky Conference

Southern Utah left the Big Sky Conference for the WAC on July 1, 2022. Southern Utah's departure left the Big Sky with 10 full members, all of which sponsor football, with Cal Poly and UC Davis as football-only members.

Northeast Conference

On March 29, 2022, Bryant announced that it would leave the Northeast Conference (NEC) that July, with most sports joining the America East Conference and football joining the Big South. On April 5, the NEC responded by adding Stonehill College for 2022–23, a football-sponsoring Division II institution from the Northeast-10 Conference.

ESPN reported on April 27 that Mount St. Mary's, a full NEC member without a football program, was in the process of a move to the Metro Atlantic Athletic Conference (MAAC), where it would join several other basketball-focused private schools. The conference change was officially announced on May 2, 2022, effective that July.

During this realignment, the NEC also announced that it would begin sponsoring men's volleyball in the 2023 season (2022–23 school year) with six teams. The NEC became the second D-I all-sports conference to sponsor the sport, after the Big West Conference. Before the 2022 season, only three NEC members (Sacred Heart, St. Francis Brooklyn, and Saint Francis (PA)) had men's volleyball programs, all competing in the single-sport Eastern Intercollegiate Volleyball Association. In the 2022 season, two more full NEC members, Fairleigh Dickinson and LIU, began sponsoring men's volleyball, competing as independents. When announcing its new men's volleyball league, the NEC announced that Merrimack, an all-sports member transitioning from Division II, would launch a men's volleyball program and become the sixth member, thereby reaching the required membership level for an eventual automatic bid to the combined D-I and D-II championship. The EIVA retained six members, maintaining its automatic bid. The NEC eventually added two Division II schools, Daemen and D'Youville, as associate members for its first men's volleyball season.

On May 9, 2022, NEC commissioner Noreen Morris indicated in a Twitter post that the NEC would not sponsor men's lacrosse after the 2021–22 school year. The conference had already lost full members Bryant and Mount St. Mary's, and the impending addition of men's lacrosse by the Atlantic 10 Conference (A-10), confirmed later that month, took away both NEC men's lacrosse affiliates (Hobart and Saint Joseph's). Three of the remaining four NEC men's lacrosse schools, full conference members LIU, Sacred Heart, and Wagner, would be taken in by the MAAC as affiliate members. According to Morris, the fourth, Merrimack, was in membership discussion with multiple lacrosse-sponsoring conferences; it eventually joined the America East Conference for that sport effective with the 2023 season (2022–23 school year).

On July 12, 2022, the NEC and Mid-Eastern Athletic Conference (MEAC) entered into a partnership for baseball and golf, under whose terms all MEAC members that sponsored baseball, men's golf, and women's golf became NEC associate members effective immediately. This marked the end of the MEAC baseball league, which had been reduced to four members due to earlier realignment. Howard, already an NEC associate in six sports, added men's golf to its NEC membership. Coppin State and Norfolk State joined for baseball; Delaware State joined for baseball and women's golf; North Carolina Central joined in men's and women's golf; and Maryland Eastern Shore joined in all three sports. Several months later, the NEC announced that Delaware State would add women's lacrosse and women's soccer to its NEC membership in 2023–24.

Missouri Valley Football Conference

On April 4, 2022, the Missouri Valley Football Conference announced that Murray State's football team would join the conference beginning with the 2023 season. The move was made as a result of Murray State's previously announced move of its other sports from the Ohio Valley Conference to the Missouri Valley Conference, a separate entity from the MVFC that does not sponsor football.

Southern Conference 
While the Southern Conference (SoCon) had no change to its full membership, the addition of men's lacrosse by the Atlantic 10 Conference led to the SoCon disbanding its men's lacrosse league after the 2022 season. The SoCon had sponsored men's lacrosse since the 2015 season, when it took over operational control of the ASUN men's lacrosse league. As part of an agreement with the SoCon, the ASUN reestablished men's lacrosse for the 2022 season, with full member Bellarmine joined by five new single-sport members, while another full ASUN member, Jacksonville, stayed in SoCon men's lacrosse with a mixture of full SoCon members and affiliates.

With Hampton moving to the CAA and affiliates High Point and Richmond (the latter a full A-10 member) moving the sport to the A-10, the SoCon was left with only three men's lacrosse members, with six required to maintain its automatic bid to the NCAA tournament. Accordingly, Jacksonville and full SoCon member Mercer moved that sport to the ASUN, while VMI, also a full SoCon member, returned to its former men's lacrosse home of the Metro Atlantic Athletic Conference;

Non-football Division I conferences affected

America East Conference

On May 6, 2021, America East Conference (AmEast) member Hartford's governing board voted to begin the process of transitioning the school's athletic program from Division I to Division III. The plan calls for the following steps:
 January 2022: Formal request for reclassification with the NCAA.
 2022–23: No athletic scholarships will be awarded to incoming students.
 2023–24: Become a provisional member in a D-III conference to be determined; transition remaining students off athletic scholarships by the end of that school year.
 2024–25: Become a full member of the aforementioned D-III conference.
 2025–26: Full D-III membership.

Hartford left the AmEast on July 1, 2022, competing as a Division I independent in 2022–23 before joining its new D-III home of the Commonwealth Coast Conference (CCC) in 2023, with the CCC announcing Hartford's arrival on June 21, 2022.

On January 25, Stony Brook was announced as a full member of the Colonial Athletic Association starting in 2022-23. The school has been a member of CAA Football since 2013.

On March 29, Bryant was announced as a new member of the America East Conference starting in 2022-23. As noted earlier, Bryant football joined the Big South Conference at that time.

Atlantic 10 Conference

On November 16, 2021, the Atlantic 10 Conference (A-10) announced that Loyola Chicago would join the conference starting with the 2022–23 season. As the A-10 does not anticipate gaining or losing any further full members for the foreseeable future, the conference now has 15 members.

Formation of A-10 men's lacrosse league 

For several years, the A-10 had been working toward establishing a men's lacrosse league. As of the 2022 season (2021–22 school year), four of its full members (Richmond, St. Bonaventure, Saint Joseph's, and UMass) sponsored men's lacrosse, two short of the number of members required for an automatic berth in the NCAA tournament. On February 2, 2022, USA Lacrosse Magazine reported that the A-10 was evaluating Fairfield, High Point, and Hobart as potential affiliates to reach the required membership total. The A-10 officially announced the addition of men's lacrosse on May 23, 2022, with the four full members joined by High Point and Hobart.

Accordingly, this meant that all of the aforementioned programs would be leaving their current conferences in order to join the A-10's new league. The Colonial Athletic Association, which was the former home of UMass men's lacrosse, was also going through a realignment of its own (see CAA section) and planned on bringing in more lacrosse sponsoring institutions to the conference, while the Metro Atlantic Athletic Conference, St. Bonaventure's former home, still sat at 6 members even after the Bonnies' departure. However, the Northeast Conference, former home of Saint Joseph's and Hobart, as well as the Southern Conference, former home of High Point and Richmond, were put in a more trying situation. The NEC, while also losing the aforementioned two programs, was also losing Bryant and Mount St. Mary's, two full NEC members that both sponsored men's lacrosse. Meanwhile, the SoCon was already sitting precariously at 6 men's lacrosse institutions, and simply couldn't afford to lose any of their members. This left both conferences with only 4 men's lacrosse sponsoring members each, and with no other option available to them, both conferences announced they would stop sponsoring the sport effective with the 2023 season. Three of the four lacrosse programs in the NEC (LIU, Sacred Heart, and Wagner) announced they would join the MAAC as men's lacrosse affiliates, while the fourth, Merrimack, ultimately announced it would house its men's lacrosse program in the America East Conference. For the SoCon, VMI announced it too would be joining the MAAC in lacrosse, which was its former home for the sport from 2002 to 2013. Meanwhile, Jacksonville returned to its full-time home of the ASUN Conference, joined by Mercer as an affiliate, while Hampton, who was poised to join the CAA as a full member in 2022, had already made plans to move its lacrosse program to the conference as well.

Horizon League 
On January 22, 2022, CBSSports.com reported that UIC would leave the Horizon League for the MVC in July. This report was confirmed on January 26 when UIC was unveiled as a new MVC member, effective that July.  The Horizon League dropped to 11 members going forward.

On July 6, 2022, the Ohio Valley Conference (OVC) and Horizon League announced their plans to merge their respective men's tennis leagues effective in the 2022–23 academic year, as already noted. OVC members that sponsor the sport, as well as Belmont, which had left the OVC days earlier for the Missouri Valley Conference, now compete as Horizon affiliate members. Chicago State also became an affiliate member in both men's and women's tennis. The Horizon's men's tennis championship now has 11 members.

Metro Atlantic Athletic Conference

On May 2, 2022, the MAAC announced that Mount St. Mary's University would be Monmouth's replacement in the conference starting with the 2022-23 season, maintaining the MAAC's membership at 11 schools.

Missouri Valley Conference

Losing Loyola Chicago, whose men's basketball team had made the Final Four in 2018 and Sweet Sixteen in 2021, was a significant athletic blow to the MVC, but was arguably a larger institutional blow. The Chicago area, especially its suburbs, is a major source of students for many MVC members, and Loyola's departure would leave the conference without a significant presence in the city. The basketball issue was addressed with the addition of Belmont and Murray State, both frequent contenders for NCAA men's tournament berths, putting the Missouri Valley Conference at 11 members. The issue of a Chicago presence was addressed by entering into negotiations with the city's largest university, UIC. CBSSports.com reported on January 22, 2022, that UIC had indeed been invited and accepted; this move was made official four days later. The conference reportedly reached out to Kansas City of the Summit League for potential membership before this, in addition to UIC, as well as Sun Belt member UT Arlington (which instead rejoined the WAC).

West Coast Conference

With Brigham Young University leaving the West Coast Conference for the Big 12 in 2023, the WCC will drop down to 9 members going forward.

On July 19, 2022 it was announced that the WCC will add men's water polo in 2023–24 with seven members (the four WCC members that sponsor the sport: Loyola Marymount, Pacific, Pepperdine and Santa Clara, plus three affiliates: Air Force, California Baptist and San Jose State). Consequently, two water polo-only conferences will be directly affected: the Western Water Polo Association will lose four of its current nine men's members and the Golden Coast Conference will lose three of its current six men's members (neither conference's women's side is affected).

Ice hockey conferences affected

Central Collegiate Hockey Association

On June 28, 2019, seven schools from the ten-member men's side of the Western Collegiate Hockey Association (WCHA) began the process of withdrawing from the conference, with the intent of forming a new conference for the 2021–22 season. These seven schools were Bemidji State, Bowling Green (who had retained the rights to the CCHA name), Ferris State, Lake Superior State, Michigan Tech, Minnesota State and Northern Michigan. The seven schools cited a more compact geographic footprint as one reason for the move; the remaining three WCHA members, Alabama-Huntsville, Alaska and Alaska–Anchorage, all geographic outliers in the WCHA, were notably absent. On February 18, 2020 these seven schools announced they would begin competing in a new CCHA in 2021–22. Later that year, the University of St. Thomas, a former D-III school who had been granted a waiver by the NCAA earlier in the year to transition directly to D-I, was announced to be joining the new CCHA as a member on July 29, 2020, bringing the membership up to an even eight teams.

On May 17, 2022, Augustana University was announced as the league's ninth member. The Vikings will play a partial league schedule in the 2023–24 and 2024-25 seasons before playing a full league schedule in 2025-26.

Western Collegiate Hockey Association

The WCHA men's side was forced to disband after seven of its 10 schools left the conference to reestablish the CCHA starting in the 2021–22 academic year. Of the other three remaining programs, Alabama-Huntsville program was disbanded after the 2020–21 season, Alaska program became independent, and Alaska–Anchorage program would be cut after the 2020-21 season due to a reduction in state funding unless the program could raise $3 million, and the program went on hiatus that year while its future was uncertain. Ultimately, the program was saved, and it returned to play in the 2022-23 season as an independent, following the dissolution of the men's side of its former conference, the WCHA.

The WCHA still operates as a women's ice hockey-only conference and the women's WCHA announced a further expansion effective in 2021–22 with the arrival of St. Thomas, a Twin Cities school that received NCAA approval to directly transition from Division III. The Summit League offered the Tommies a D-I home, and backed the school's bid to directly transition from D-III. Interestingly, St. Thomas is a member of the men's ice hockey-only CCHA (the conference that replaced the WCHA on the men's side), while being a WCHA member for its women's program.

Women's ice hockey

New England Women's Hockey Alliance
Stonehill, which had announced a move up from Division II, added women's ice hockey starting in 2022–23, joining the New England Women's Hockey Alliance (NEWHA).

On June 29, 2022, the NEWHA announced that it would expand to 8 members with the addition of Assumption University, which officially joined for administrative purposes on July 1 but will not start conference play until it launches its varsity program in the 2023–24 season.

Footnotes

Membership changes

List of confirmed and rumored changes

Membership change statistics

Full membership

Football

The following table is reflective of both football-only membership changes and full membership changes that include football. This does not reflect the impending football-only merger of the Big South and OVC because full organizational details of the merger have yet to be announced.

See also
 2010–2014 NCAA conference realignment
 2005 NCAA conference realignment
 1996 NCAA conference realignment
 List of NCAA Division I conference changes since 2010

References 

NCAA conference realignments
Southeastern Conference
Big 12 Conference
Big Ten Conference
Atlantic Coast Conference
Pac-12 Conference
American Athletic Conference
Sun Belt Conference
Conference USA
Western Athletic Conference
ASUN Conference
Colonial Athletic Association
Northeast Conference
Ohio Valley Conference
Big South Conference
Southland Conference
Big Sky Conference
America East Conference
Atlantic 10 Conference
Missouri Valley Conference
Horizon League
Metro Atlantic Athletic Conference
West Coast Conference